Risto Kalevi Jussilainen (born 10 June 1975) is a Finnish former ski jumper.

Career
Jussilainen's career best achievement was a silver medal in the team large hill competition at the 2002 Winter Olympics in Salt Lake City. At World Cup level he won two individual and seven team competitions (normal hill, large hill and ski flying) between 2000 and 2002. In the 2000/01 season he finished third in the overall standings. He also won silver medals in both team competitions (normal and large hills) at the 2001 World Championships.

During his career he won two World Cup competitions, an Olympic medal and three World Championship medals.

World Cup

Standings

Wins

References

1975 births
Living people
Sportspeople from Jyväskylä
Ski jumpers at the 2002 Winter Olympics
Ski jumpers at the 2006 Winter Olympics
Finnish male ski jumpers
Olympic ski jumpers of Finland
Olympic silver medalists for Finland
Olympic medalists in ski jumping
FIS Nordic World Ski Championships medalists in ski jumping
Medalists at the 2002 Winter Olympics
21st-century Finnish people